Jan Jansz. Starter (1593 – 1626) was a poet from the Northern Netherlands.

Starter was born in Amsterdam and became a prolific writer, whose poems were set to melody in his lifetime. He died young in battle. Many of his poems became the subject of other artworks such as plays or paintings. He is best known for his poem about the "Mennonite Sister".

References 
 Starter in the French National Biography database

1593 births
1626 deaths
Writers from Amsterdam
17th-century Dutch poets
Dutch male poets
17th-century male writers